Li Dongyin (born 6 July 1995) is a Chinese canoeist. She competed in the women's K-2 500 metres and the K-4 500 metres  events at the 2020 Summer Olympics.

References

External links
 

1995 births
Living people
Chinese female canoeists
Canoeists at the 2020 Summer Olympics
Olympic canoeists of China